Glogovica may refer to:

Glogovica (Doboj), a village in the municipality of Doboj, Bosnia and Herzegovina
Glogovica (Tran), a village in Tran Municipality, Bulgaria
Glogovica (river), a river in Croatia
 Glogovica (Podcrkavlje), a settlement in the municipality of Podcrkavlje, Brod-Posavina County, Croatia
Glogovica (Pristina), a village in Pristina, Kosovo
Glogovica (Aleksinac), a village in the municipality of Aleksinac, Serbia
 Glogovica (Zaječar), a village in the municipality of Zaječar, Serbia
Glogovica, Ivančna Gorica, a settlement in the municipality of Ivančna Gorica, Slovenia